The 1905–06 Holy Cross Crusaders men's basketball team represented The College of the Holy Cross during the 1905–06 college men's basketball season. The head coach was Fred Powers, coaching the crusaders in his fifth season.

Schedule

|-

References

Holy Cross Crusaders men's basketball seasons
Holy Cross